This is a list of folk songs and traditional sevdalinka songs which originated in Bosnia and Herzegovina but are also popular in Croatia, Macedonia, Montenegro and Serbia.

A

Ah, što ćemo ljubav kriti

Aj, kolika je Jahorina planina

E

Emina

Emina was originally a poem written by Bosnian Serb poet Aleksa Šantić, being first published in 1902. It became a popular sevdalinka covered by many artists from the former Yugoslav republics over the course of the 20th century. The subject of the song is Šantić's teenage neighbor, a Bosniak girl named Emina Sefić. It is one of the most well-known sevdalinka songs of all time.

Many artists have covered the song, but the version by fellow Mostar native, Bosnian singer Himzo Polovina, remains the most popular. Upon hearing of the death of Emina Sefić, Polovina went to poet Sevda Katica's home in the village of Donja Mahala. He found her in the yard of the family home, informed her of Emina's death and she shuddered with grief and spoke the verses:

Polovina recorded the song and added Sevda's new verses.

I

Istom zora na iztoku rudi
A very old Bosnian historical poem about Muhamed (Mujo) Isabegović, son of Isa-beg Ishaković.

J

Ja kakva je sjajna mjesečina
Very old Bosnian traditional folk ballad.

K

Kad ja pođoh (na Bembašu)
Kad ja pođoh (na Bembašu)

Karanfil se na put sprema
A Bosnian traditional folk song. Although the song is much older, the first known recording was in 1935 in Gacko to the voice of a Bosniak peasant singer in her 60s named Halima Hrvo (née Đemo) from the village of Tjentište near Foča.

Kraj potoka bistre vode

Kraj tanana šadrvana
Kraj tanana šadrvana was translated into Bosnian in 1923 by Aleksa Šantić from a poem called Der Asra (The Azra) by the German poet Heinrich Heine.

M

Moj dilbere

Moj dilbere has been in Bosnia since Ottoman times. The exact authors are unknown and Moj dilbere is considered to be a traditional song.

O
Oj Užice, mali Carigrade

Omer-beže na kuli sjeđaše

R
Razbolje se lijepa Hajrija (Beautiful Hajrija Became Ill)
Razbolje se Sultan Sulejman (Sultan Suleiman Became Ill)

S

Sejdefu majka buđaše

Sejdefu majka buđaše is a folk song that is believed to have originated in Sarajevo centuries ago, while the region of Bosnia was a part of the Ottoman Empire. The exact author is unknown.

Over the centuries, the song spread amongst the Bosniak populations in Podgorica and the Sandžak regions of Montenegro and Serbia, respectively.

T
Tekla rijeka potokom i jazom (River Flowed Through the Stream and Divide)
Teško meni jadnoj u Saraj’vu samoj (It's Difficult for Me, a Poor [Woman] Alone in Saraj'vo)

Z

Zapjevala sojka ptica (Blue Jay Bird Sang)
Zaplakala šećer Đula (The Sweet Rose Wept)
Zaplakala stara majka (The Elderly Mother Wept)
Zmaj od Bosne (Dragon of Bosnia)
Zvijezda tjera mjeseca (The Star Chases the Moon)

See also
List of Bosnia and Herzegovina patriotic songs
Music of Bosnia and Herzegovina
Sevdalinka

References

 
 
Folk songs